Sven Hanson (2 February 1892 – 22 June 1972) was a Swedish swimmer. He competed in the men's 200 metre breaststroke event at the 1912 Summer Olympics.

References

External links
 

1892 births
1972 deaths
Olympic swimmers of Sweden
Swimmers at the 1912 Summer Olympics
People from Kristinehamn Municipality
Swedish male breaststroke swimmers
Sportspeople from Värmland County